60 athletes (41 men and 19 women) from Brazil competed at the 1996 Summer Paralympics in Atlanta, United States.

Medallists

See also
Brazil at the Paralympics
Brazil at the 1996 Summer Olympics

References 

Nations at the 1996 Summer Paralympics
1996
Summer Paralympics